The following is a list of past and current commercial operators of the Boeing 767, and any of its variants.

Current operators 
As of March 2023, there were 764 Boeing 767 aircraft in service, comprising 68 767-200s, 659 767-300s and 37 767-400ERs, as listed by variant in the following table.

Former airline operators

Africa
Algeria
Air Algérie
Cameroon
 Cameroon Airlines - ceased operations March, 2008
Congo

 EC Air

Egypt

EgyptAir

Eritrea

 Eritrean Airlines

Ghana 
 Ghana International Airlines
Mauritius
 Air Mauritius
Mozambique
 Linhas Aéreas de Moçambique
Namibia
 Air Namibia
Nigeria
Bellview Airlines - ceased operations in 2009
Med-View Airline

South Africa
 Nationwide Airlines - ceased operations April 29, 2008
 South African Airways
 Comair (South Africa) - ceased operations in 2022
 Interair South Africa
Tanzania
 Air Tanzania
Zimbabwe
Air Zimbabwe

Americas
Argentina
 LATAM Airlines Argentina
 LAPA - ceased operations
Aruba
 Air Aruba - ceased operations in 2000
Bolivia
 Lloyd Aéreo Boliviano
 Aerosur - ceased operations in 2012
Brazil
 BRA Transportes Aéreos - ceased operations November 7, 2007
 OceanAir
 Transbrasil - ceased operations December, 2001
 Varig - merged into Gol Transportes Aéreos
Canada
 Air Canada
 Air Canada Rouge
 Canadian Airlines International (1988–2001) merged with Air Canada in 1999
 Pacific Western Airlines (1983–1987) merged with CP Air to form Canadian Airlines International.
 Skyservice Airlines  (1994–2010) ceased operations
 Sunwing Airlines (2011–2012)
 Zoom Airlines - ceased operations August 28, 2008

Colombia
 Avianca
 LANCO
 LATAM Colombia
 Tampa Cargo

El Salvador
 TACA Airlines

Jamaica
 Air Jamaica
 Fly Jamaica Airways
Mexico
 Mexicana - ceased operations in 2010
 Aeroméxico

Peru
 Aero Continente - ceased operations July 12, 2004

United States of America
 American Airlines
 Continental Airlines - merged with United Airlines in March 2012
 MAXjet Airways - ceased operations December 24, 2007
 Piedmont Airlines
 Trans World Airlines - (1982–2001) merged into American Airlines
Vision Airlines

Uruguay
 PLUNA - ceased operations July 5, 2012.

Venezuela
 Santa Barbara Airlines
SBA Airlines - ceased operations in 2018.

Asia
Afghanistan

 Kam Air
Safi Airways - ceased operations in 2017.

Bahrain
 Gulf Air
Bangladesh
 GMG Airlines
Brunei
 Royal Brunei Airlines
China
 Air China
 China Eastern Airlines
 China Yunnan Airlines - merged with China Eastern Airlines
Hainan Airlines
Shanghai Airlines

India
 Air India
Iraq
Iraqi Airways
Israel
 Israir
 EL AL
Japan
Air Japan
Kuwait 
 Kuwait Airways
Macau
 Viva Macau - ceased operations April 2010

Maldives

 Mega Maldives

Mongolia
 MIAT Mongolian Airlines
Nepal
 Nepal Airlines
Oman
 Oman Air
Taiwan
 China Airlines
 EVA Air

Sri Lanka
 SriLankan Airlines

Thailand
Asia Atlantic Airlines
Orient Thai Airlines - suspended in 2018.
PBair
 SkyStar Airways - ceased operations in 2009

Turkmenistan
 Turkmenistan Airlines

United Arab Emirates
 Etihad Airways
 Gulf Traveller - ceased operations in 2007

Vietnam
 Vietnam Airlines

Europe
Austria
 Lauda Air merged into Austrian Airlines

Belgium
 ASL Airlines Belgium
 CityBird - ceased operations October, 2001
 Sobelair - ceased operations January 19, 2004
 TUI fly Belgium

Bulgaria
 Balkan Airlines - ceased operations in 2002

France
 Aeris - ceased operations August, 2003
 Air France
 Aéromaritime (1990–1991)

Germany
 Condor
 LTU
 Lufthansa

Hungary
 Malév Hungarian Airlines 

Ireland

 Aer Lingus

Italy
 Air Italy
 Alitalia
 Blue Panorama Airlines
 NEOS

Latvia
 Smartlynx

Netherlands
 KLM
 Martinair

Norway
 Braathens SAFE - ceased operations in 2007

Poland
 LOT Polish Airlines

Russia
 Aeroflot
 Krasair
Nordwind Airlines
S7 Airlines
VIM Airlines

Spain
 Spanair

Sweden
 Swefly - ceased operations in 2006
 SAS

Switzerland
 Balair - ceased operations in 1993
 Belair
 Swiss World Airways - ceased operations in 1998

Ukraine
 AeroSvit - ceased operations in 2013
 Dniproavia

United Kingdom
 Air 2000 - re-branded as First Choice Airways in March 2004
 Air Atlanta Europe - merged into Excel Airways, 1 May 2006
 Airtours - re-branded as MyTravel Airways in 2004
 Britannia Airways - (1983–2005) re-branded as Thomsonfly
British Airways - retired last 767s in December 2018
 Excel Airways - re-branded as XL Airways in November 2006
 First Choice Airways merged into Thomson Airways, 1 November 2008
 Flyglobespan - ceased operations, 16 December 2009
 Flyjet - ceased operations, 31 October 2007
 Leisure International Airways - merged into Air 2000 in the 1990s
 Monarch Airlines
 MyTravel Airways - merged into Thomas Cook Airlines, 30 March 2008
 Silverjet - ceased operations, 13 June 2008
Thomas Cook Airlines - retired 767s in 2018.
 Thomsonfly - Merged into Thomson Airways, 1 November 2008
 Titan Airways
 UK International Airlines - ceased operations, 23 December 2007
 XL Airways UK - ceased operations, 12 September 2008

Oceania
Australia
 Ansett - ceased operations March 4, 2002
 Australian Airlines - ceased operations July 28, 2006
 Qantas - Retired Last Flight 27 December 2014 Operated by VH-OGL as QF767 MEL to SYD Qantas had 41 aircraft from lease and owned 7 767-200ERs, 7  767-336ER from British Airways and 27 767-338ER
New Zealand
 Air New Zealand - Last 767-300ER retired in 2017
Samoa
 Polynesian Airlines

Current government and military operators

Azerbaijan
 Azerbaijan Government - one 767-300ER leased from Azerbaijan Airlines
Bahrain
Bahrain Royal Flight - one 767-400ER
Belarus
Belarus Government one 767-300ER

Brazil

 Brazilian Air Force - one 767-300ER
Brunei
Brunei Government - one 767-200ER
Colombia
Colombian Air Force - one 767-200ER
Chile
Chilean Air Force - one 767-300ER
Djibouti
Djibouti Government - one 767-200ER
Italy
Italian Air Force - operates 4 KC-767
Japan
Japan Air Self-Defense Force - four E-767 and four KC-767 in operation plus four KC-46 on order
Turkmenistan
Turkmenistan Government - one 767-300ER
Uzbekistan
Military of Uzbekistan - one 767-300

References

External links 

767
Operators